The Sistema de Transporte Público Cablebús, simply branded as Cablebús, is an aerial lift transport system that runs in the Gustavo A. Madero and Iztapalapa areas of Mexico City. It is operated by Servicio de Transportes Eléctricos, the agency responsible for the operation of all trolleybus and light rail services in Mexico City. Line 1 was officially inaugurated on 11 July 2021, going from the Indios Verdes station of the STC Metro to the northern neighborhoods of Gustavo A. Madero. Line 2 runs from the Constitución de 1917 to the Santa Marta STC Metro stations in the southeast of the city.

History
Line 1's construction started in September 2019 with an investment of 3 billion Mexican pesos. Doppelmayr México and Grupo Indi built Line 1; Leitner Ropeways built Line 2.

On 4 March 2021, Line 1's Campos Revolución and Tlalpexco stations were opened for operational trials, and the rest of the line was officially inaugurated on 11 July 2021. Line 2 was inaugurated on 8 August 2021.

Service
The fare is 7 pesos (MXN) per travel. Service is free of charge for users over 70 years of age, children under 5 years of age, and people with evident disabilities.

Similarly to the Mexico City Metro system, Cablebús stations feature pictograms symbolizing either the names of the stations or a significant feature in the region. They were designed by American graphic designer Lance Wyman, who also designed all the pictograms for the Movilidad Integrada system. The system is light blue-colored representing the color of the sky.

Stations

Line 1

Line 1 is located in the northernmost borough of Gustavo A. Madero. It runs  from the area serving the Indios Verdes STC Metro station to the Campos Revolución STC Metro station, where the line divides into two cables for transfer, one toward Cuautepec station and the other toward Tlalpexco station, in the Cerro del Chiquihuite. The ropeway installation for Line 1 was built by Doppelmayr Mexico. The cabins are the OMEGA V cabins by CWA Constructions, which have won a Red Dot Award for their outstanding design.

{| class="wikitable"
|-
! width="160px" | Stations
! Connection(s)
! Picture
! Date opened
|-
|  Indios Verdes
| 
 Indios Verdes
  Line 3: Indios Verdes station
 : Line 1: Indios Verdes station
 : Line 3: Indios Verdes station
 : Line 7: Indios Verdes station
  Line IV: Indios Verdes station
 Line 2: Indios Verdes station (under construction)
 Routes: 101, 101-A, 101-B, 101-D, 102, 107-B (at distance), 108
| 
| rowspan=3| 11 July 2021
|-
|  Santa María Ticomán
|
 Routes: 101, 102, 108
| 
|-
|  La Pastora
|
 Routes: 101, 101-A, 101-B, 101-D, 102, 103, 104, 108
| 
|-
|  Campos Revolución
|
 Routes: 101, 101-A, 101-B 101-D, 102, 103
| 
| 4 March 2021
|-
|  Cuautepec
|
 Routes: 101, 101-A, 101-B, 101-D, 102, 103, 104
|
| 11 July 2021
|-
|  Tlalpexco
|
| 
| 4 March 2021
|}

Line 2

Line 2 is located in the eastern borough of Iztapalapa. It runs  from the area serving the Constitución de 1917 metro station to Santa Marta metro station, passing through the southern neighborhoods of the borough.  It is the longest public cable car line in the world. The Line is divided in two sections and commuters have to get off at Xalpa station if they want to continue their ride.

{| class="wikitable"
|-
! width="160px" | Stations
! Connection(s)
! Picture
! Date opened
|-
|  Constitución de 1917
|
 Constitución de 1917
  Line 8: Constitución de 1917 station
 Routes: 1-D, 47-A, 57-A, 57-C, 159, 161, 161-C, 161-D, 161-E, 161-F, 162, 165-A
 Route: 4-B
 Line 10: Constitución de 1917 station
| 
| rowspan=7| 8 August 2021
|-
|  Quetzalcóatl
|
 Route: 161-E
| 
|-
|  Las Torres Buenavista
|
| 
|-
|  Xalpa
| 
 Route: 161-C
| 
|-
|  Lomas de la Estancia
|
 Route: 161
| 
|-
|  San Miguel Teotongo
|
 Routes: 163, 163-B
| 
|-
|  Santa Marta
|
 Santa Marta
  Line A: Santa Marta station
 Routes: 1-D, 52-C
 Line 10: Santa Marta station (under construction)
| 
|}

Future

Line 3
The project was originally planned to have four stations that would connect all four Chapultepec park sections, in Miguel Hidalgo. 

On July 20, 2021, the tender for the first stage of the line was presented, which will have a length of 5.42 km, 180 cabins and 6 stations. The planned number of station was later increased to eleven and expanded to the high areas of the neighboring borough of Álvaro Obregón. It is expected to conclude in December 2023.

{| class="wikitable"
|-
! width="160px" | Stations
! Connection(s)
! Borough
! Picture
! To be opened
|-
| Los Pinos
|

  Line 7: Constituyentes station
 Routes: 34-A
 Route: 8-C
| rowspan=3| Miguel Hidalgo
| rowspan=6| 
| rowspan=6| Expected December 2023
|-
| Panteón Dolores
|
|-
| CECyT 4 / Lienzo Charro
|
|-
| Parque Cri-Cri
|
| rowspan=3| Álvaro Obregón
|-
| Cineteca Nacional
|
|-
| Vasco de Quiroga
|
<li> Vasco de Quiroga railway station (under construction)
|}

Line 4
The line is planned to go from Magdalena Contreras to Tlalpan, southeastern Mexico City.

See also
Mexicable, a similar system operating in the neighboring State of Mexico.

Notes

References

External links
 
 

2021 establishments in Mexico
Gondola lifts in Mexico